The 2017–18 Tweede Divisie season is the second edition of the Dutch third tier since on hiatus from 1970-71 season and the 17th edition using Tweede Divisie name. Thirteen teams competed from the last season along with one relegated team from the Eerste Divisie and four promoted teams from the Derde Divisie.

At an extraordinary KNVB federation meeting on 2 October 2017, representatives of the amateur and professional football reached an agreement about the route to be taken to renew the football pyramid. Part of this agreement was that no promotion/relegation will take place between the Eerste and Tweede Divisie for the current season.

Teams

Standings

References 

Tweede Divisie seasons
3
Ned